Roy Wood (born 8 November 1946) is an English musician and singer-songwriter. He was particularly successful in the 1960s and 1970s as member and co-founder of the Move, Electric Light Orchestra and Wizzard. As a songwriter, he contributed a number of hits to the repertoire of these bands.  Altogether he had more than 20 singles in the UK Singles Chart under various guises, including three UK No. 1 hits.

The BBC has described Wood as being "responsible for some of the most memorable sounds of the Seventies" and "credited as playing a major role in the glam rock, psychedelic and prog rock movements". In 2008, Wood was awarded an honorary doctorate for his contribution to rock and pop by the University of Derby. In 2015, his long and eclectic career was recognised with the "Outer Limits" award at the Progressive Music Awards in London.

Wood was inducted into the Rock and Roll Hall of Fame in 2017 as a member of Electric Light Orchestra.

Career

Early years
Roy Wood was born on 8 November 1946 in Kitts Green, a suburb of Birmingham, England. For some years the legend persisted that his real name was Ulysses Adrian Wood, until it was revealed that this was probably the result of somebody close to The Move in their early days filling in such names on a 'lifelines' feature for the press as a joke. His first group in Birmingham in the early 1960s was the Falcons, which he left in 1963 to join Gerry Levene and the Avengers. He then moved to Mike Sheridan and the Nightriders (the band later became the Idle Race). He attended the Moseley College of Art, but was expelled in 1964.

The Move

From this and other Birmingham-based groups, was formed The Move, and they quickly entered the UK Singles Chart. Their single "Night of Fear" climbed to No. 2 in early 1967. Their third hit, "Flowers in the Rain", was the first song played by Tony Blackburn at the launch of BBC Radio 1 on September 30, 1967, and the band evolved over a three-year period. After the departure of The Move's lead singer Carl Wayne, Wood's influence became more prominent. In 1967, Wood (and fellow Move member Trevor Burton) supplied backing vocals on the track, "You Got Me Floatin'", on the Jimi Hendrix Experience's album Axis: Bold as Love.

Wood was keen on musical experimentation and was an early proponent of combining rock and roll and pop music with other styles, such as classical music, or the big band sound, and introduced classically styled string and brass sections into the pop record. In early 1972, Wood's composition "Songs of Praise" was shortlisted by the BBC as one of six possible choices for the UK entry in the Eurovision Song Contest 1972. When performed by the New Seekers on the Cliff Richard vehicle It's Cliff Richard!, the song finished in last place with 3,842 votes. The group included the track on their album We'd Like to Teach the World to Sing. Wood recorded his own version of "Songs of Praise", releasing it on the B-side of his 1973 single, "Dear Elaine".

Electric Light Orchestra
Whilst The Move were still together, Wood, along with his band colleagues Jeff Lynne and Bev Bevan, founded Electric Light Orchestra (ELO), which was later to gain major commercial success. The original intention was to split The Move at the end of 1970, but contractual obligations meant that both they and ELO existed together for a year, until the former finally broke up in June 1972.

In 2017, the ELO line-up of Roy Wood, Jeff Lynne, Bev Bevan, and Richard Tandy were inducted into the Rock and Roll Hall of Fame.

Early ELO concerts and formation of Wizzard
ELO's early live performances were chaotic, due to both poor sound quality of the string instruments competing against the guitars and drums, as well as Wood's constant moving from instrument to instrument during the shows (playing bass, guitar, cello and saxophone). After increasing tensions, Wood left in July 1972 at the start of the second album sessions, following a trip to Italy and formed a new group, Wizzard, which assembled cellists, brass players and a bigger rhythm section, with several drummers and percussionists. Wood emulated the wall of sound production style of Phil Spector while successfully and affectionately pastiching the rock and roll style of the early 1960s. Wizzard scored seven UK Singles Chart hits with different songs during this period including two consecutive singles, "See My Baby Jive" and "Angel Fingers" which reached the top of that chart. Meanwhile, he released several solo albums, exploring further musical directions. His 1973 album Boulders was an almost entirely genuine solo effort, right down to the sleeve artwork, with Wood playing a wide variety of musical instruments. A second solo album, Mustard, released in 1975 and including contributions by Phil Everly and Annie Haslam, was less successful.

Post-Wizzard
By the late 1970s, Wood was appearing less in public; commercial success faded away, and his musical experiments did not always match popular taste, but he remained productive in the studio as musician, producer and songwriter. He was a fan of Elvis Presley, but never succeeded in getting him to adopt one of his compositions. However, he was untiring as a producer for other acts, most successfully doo-wop revivalists Darts. In 1976, Wood recorded the Beatles songs "Lovely Rita" and "Polythene Pam" for the ill-fated musical documentary All This and World War II.

The Wizzo Band and subsequent work
In 1977, he formed Wizzo Band, a jazz-rock ensemble, whose only live performance was a BBC simultaneous television and radio broadcast in stereo. The Wizzo Band split early the following year after cancelling a nationwide tour.

Between 1980 and 1982, Wood released a few singles under his own name and also as Roy Wood's Helicopters, and played some live dates under this name, with a band comprising Robin George (guitar), Terry Rowley (keyboards), Jon Camp (bass) and Tom Farnell (drums). The release of what would have been the last of these singles, "Aerial Pictures", backed with "Airborne", was cancelled owing to the lack of chart success for its predecessors, but both sides appeared for the first time in 2006 on a compilation CD, Roy Wood – The Wizzard!. "Aerial Pictures", using the original backing track, subsequently became a solo single for Carl Wayne, The Move's former vocalist.

Wood also made a one-off rock and roll medley single with Phil Lynott, Chas Hodges and John Coghlan, credited to The Rockers, "We Are The Boys" (1983), and played a leading role in the Birmingham Heart Beat Charity Concert 1986, on 15 March 1986, which was later partly televised by the BBC. As well as designing the logo, Wood performed in a line-up which also included the Electric Light Orchestra and the Moody Blues.

After a hiatus following the release of the album Starting Up (1987), a cover version of the Len Barry hit "1–2–3", and a guest vocal appearance on one track on Rick Wakeman's The Time Machine, he went on the road with a band billed as Roy Wood's Army. He also wrote and recorded two tracks with Lynne in 1989 ("If You Can't Get What You Want" and "Me and You"), which were never released.

His most regularly broadcast song is the seasonal Wizzard single "I Wish It Could Be Christmas Everyday". In 1995, Wood released a new live version as the 'Roy Wood Big Band', which charted at No. 59, and in 2000 he joined forces with Mike Batt and the Wombles, for a re-working of "I Wish It Could Be Christmas Everyday" and the Wombles' hit "Wombling Merry Christmas", together in one song which reached No. 22. Over Christmas 2007, Wood appeared in a catalogue advertisement for Argos, where he played the part of a rowdy neighbour playing guitar along to Wizzard's "I Wish It Could Be Christmas Everyday", and the song once again entered the UK Singles Chart, peaking at No. 16. In the 2010 Christmas special of the ITV comedy Benidorm, Wood in a cameo role performed his Christmas hit at the Benidorm Palace cabaret theatre. He later performed with Wizzard on the Christmas edition of Pointless Celebrities in December 2013.

Wood formed the Roy Wood Rock & Roll Band for occasional live dates and television performances in the UK. They were the support act for Status Quo at several UK dates in the weeks leading up to Christmas 2009 and 2011. In December 2018, Wood and his band's touring equipment worth £100,000 was stolen following a ram-raid on a warehouse in Leeds. The police later recovered the van and equipment in East Ardsley.

Personal life
Roy Wood currently lives in the former Howard Arms public house in Cubley, Derbyshire. Wood voted to leave the European Union in the 23 June 2016 referendum, and in May 2019 joined the Brexit Party. Wood has one child.

Discography

Chronological album discography
For the complete Move discography see The Move Discography
For the complete ELO discography see Electric Light Orchestra discography
For the complete Wizzard discography see Wizzard Discography
List of songs written by Roy Wood

 The Move (1968) – The Move
 Shazam (1970) – The Move
 Looking On (1970) – The Move
 Message from the Country (1971) – The Move
 The Electric Light Orchestra (1971) – ELO
 ELO 2 (1973) – ELO (although uncredited at the time, Wood played cello and bass on "In Old England Town" and "From the Sun to the World").
 Wizzard Brew (1973) – Wizzard
 Boulders (1973) – Solo
 Introducing Eddy and the Falcons (1974) – Wizzard
 Mustard (1975) – Solo
 Super Active Wizzo (1977) – Wizzo Band
 On The Road Again (1979) – Solo
 Starting Up (1987) – Solo
 Main Street (2000) – Roy Wood & Wizzard

Solo albums

Sources:

Collaboration album

Source:

Charting compilation album

Source:

Solo singles

Source:

Collaboration singles

Source:

Songs recorded and released by other artists

References

External links
 – official site

1946 births
Living people
20th-century English painters
21st-century English painters
21st-century clarinetists
21st-century double-bassists
21st-century flautists
21st-century saxophonists
Alumni of the University of Derby
Art rock musicians
Bagpipe players
British male saxophonists
British pop cellists
British recorder players
British rock cellists
Electric Light Orchestra members
English cellists
English clarinetists
English double-bassists
English horn players
English male painters
English male singer-songwriters
English multi-instrumentalists
English oboists
English record producers
English rock bass guitarists
English rock drummers
English rock guitarists
English rock keyboardists
English rock saxophonists
Glam rock musicians
Harvest Records artists
Ivor Novello Award winners
Lead guitarists
Male bass guitarists
Male double-bassists
Male oboists
Musicians from Birmingham, West Midlands
People from Birmingham, West Midlands
Progressive rock guitarists
Progressive rock keyboardists
Renaissance (band) members
Rhythm guitarists
Rock oboists
Sitar players
Slide guitarists
The Idle Race members
The Move members
Warner Records artists
Wizzard members